This is an oral epic of the Kuruba Community in the districts of Belgaum, Gulbarga and Bellary
Bagalkot,
Vijayapura (Bijapur)  This oral epic has preserved for generations the collective experiences of the community and its cultural heroes, and its living traditions.  This version was sung by an old reputed singer called Siddappa Meti and his associates, runs to 23,250 lines.  During the performance of this epic, the singer sings to the rhythm of a small drum; and no other instrument is used.  Both in rhythm and style, this is different from the other two epics described earlier.  (Male Mahadeshwara and Manteswamy).  Whereas the earlier ones use both stylised prose and verse, this narrative is completely in verse; and at the end of each unit, the singer's name is used.  There are two heroes in this epic (Beerappa and Maalingaraya) and many inset-stories.  Since many stories and incidents follow each other swiftly, there is not much room for descriptions.  There are fourteen cantos (adhyaaya) and each canto consists of many sections (Sandu).

Outline 

The outline of the primary narrative is as follows: the first canto begins with a 'creation myth' and ends with the birth of Muddugonda and Muddavva, the forefathers of the shepherd community. The next seven cantos narrate the story of Beerappa, the patron-god of the community. Since Beerappa's parents did not have children for long, they undertook severe penance addressed to Shiva; pleased him with their devotion; and got a son called Beerappa. But, owing to the machinations of Beerappa's maternal uncle (mother's brother), the child is abandoned in a forest. There, one Maayavva, the daughter of the king of Devagiri, comes across the child and nourishes it. Under her care, Beerappa grows into a very powerful youth and successfully performs many adventures. When he reaches adulthood, he vows to marry his maternal uncle's daughter; goes through many tests and ordeals, and finally succeeds in marrying her. After marriage, he undertakes long journeys accompanied by his mother; and through his adventures and miracles he establishes his divinity.

2nd & 3rd Canto 

The next two cantos narrate the story of Maalingaraya, the great devotee of Beerappa and the cultural hero of the shepherd community. (This part is sung independently also.) There are two brothers, disciples of Guru Gorakhnath, who, with Shiva's blessings, get two sons: Jakkappa and Maalappa (who later becomes famous as Maalingaraya). Once, during a war with a community of hunters, the younger brother dies and the elder brother vows to avenge his death. He goes to his Guru (Gorakhnath), learns not only military skills but also black magic, and on his return routs the enemy community of hunters. Once, he defeats even the Sultan of Delhi, the most powerful ruler at that time. As his sons grow up, they are suitably married off. Beerappa of divine origin learns through Shiva that Maalappa is the most appropriate person to be his disciple; goes to him in the form of a young deer, attracts him through his magical deeds, and persuades him to become his disciple.

Other Cantos 

The remaining cantos (11-14) narrate different stories which are only very loosely connected with these two major stories.

Special Features of the Epic 
Versification
The first distinctive characteristic of this epic is its metre, which resembles the Lalita Ragale of Kannada, the Lavanis of Marathi, and, surprisingly, the alliterative metre of Beowulf of Old English.  A line is the unit of versification and each line can be divided into two equal parts; and the second part of one line becomes the first part of the next line.  
Creation Myth:
The Creation Myth, with which this epic begins, is one of the glorious myths of that kind.  To summarise the myth: 'In the beginning, there was only water, formless and motionless.  Then there arose a huge bubble above water which, gradually, took the shape of head and torso.  It was Akhandeshwara (one who contains everything).  He created first sounds, then words, and then rhythm / music.  In the third age, He created out of his two left ribs Aadishakti (Primeval Energy).  Then, She, united with Him, gave birth first to demons.  The sun and the Moon in the fourth age, 21 million creatures of water in the sixth age, and later the gods – Brahma, Vishnu, Maheshwara, and others – were born.  In the very end was born Shaantamuthyaa, the forefather of the shepherd community.'

When we analyse this 'creation myth,' we find the following points:

a)     According to the classification of Creation Myths by Charles Long, this myth belongs to the category of 'De Deo' myths; that is, the myths that posit that the whole creation was by an All Knowing and All Powerful God.  From this point of view, it is interesting to observe that most of the creation myths in the Vedas as well as folk epics fall into the categories of 'De Deo' or 'Cosmic Egg'  myths.

b)      According to the present myth, the first to be created were 'Sound' 'Word' and 'Rhythm.'  This brings to one's mind the famous concept creation in Taittiriya Upanishad: " The gods gave birth, first, to Vak , the Word; and later all creatures including Man used it."  Similarly, the great Sanskrit grammarian, Bhartrhari, also says: " The Word has neither a beginning nor an end."  Again, one is reminded of the Biblical statement: " In the beginning, there was the Word.
Narrative Motifs:
The narrative motif of 'Uncle-nephew confrontation' is common to all the folk narratives of the various shepherd-communities.  Not surprisingly, since Krishna also was a cowherd, even the Bhagawata has the motif of ' Uncle-nephew confrontation,' due to which Krishna finally kills his maternal uncle Kansa.
Religion:
This  epic of Haalumatha  bears the imprint of both Shaivism and the Natha-cult.  Probably, the shepherd community, which belonged to the Natha-cult in the beginning, might have converted to Shaivism later on.

References
 Haalumatha

Epic poems
Indian literature